This article details Trailer Nos. 34–39 of the Manx Electric Railway on the Isle of Man.

These lightweight trailers were purchased in 1894 for the opening of the new part of the line between Groudle Glen and Laxey Station and were of lightweight construction; of the four supplied only two survive today, with 38 and 39 having been lost in the Laxey Car Sheds fire of 1930 and not replaced.  Happily though No. 37 remains as part of the active fleet in particular used to accompany Car No. 2 as part of the "vintage" set during enthusiasts events.  The other surviving member of the class, No. 36 remains in store at Homefield Bus Garage having been out of use for many years the car shed at Laxey until its roof was removed.  The remaining serviceable trailer carries a plain red livery and does not carry any operating titles, just the fleet number on the dash panels.

References

Sources
 Manx Manx Electric Railway Fleetlist (2002) Manx Electric Railway Society
 Island Island Images: Manx Electric Railway Pages (2003) Jon Wornham
 Official Official Tourist Department Page (2009) Isle Of Man Heritage Railways

Manx Electric Railway